Tarbert a place name in Scotland and Ireland.

Tarbert may refer to the following places:

Settlements
 Tarbert, Isle of Gigha, Scotland
 Tarbert, Harris, a ferry port on Harris, Scotland
 Tarbert, Jura, on the east coast of the island of Jura
 Tarbert, County Kerry, a ferry port on the estuary of the River Shannon in County Kerry, Ireland
 Tarbert, Kintyre the town at the northern end of the Kintyre peninsula, Argyll and Bute, Scotland
 Tarbert, Ontario, Canada

Sea lochs
 West Loch Tarbert by Harris in the Western Isles of Scotland
 East Loch Tarbert by Harris in the Western Isles of Scotland
 West Loch Tarbert, Argyll by Tarbert in Argyll, Scotland 
 East Loch Tarbert, Argyll by Tarbert in Argyll, Scotland 
 Loch Tarbert, Jura by Tarbert on the island of Jura

Other uses
 Tarbert (Parliament of Scotland constituency)

See also
 Tarbet (disambiguation)
 Tarbat